Observatory Lane is a cricket ground in Rathmines, Dublin, Ireland.

History
Leinster Cricket Club was founded in 1852, originally playing matches at nearby Grosvenor Square, before moving to Observatory Lane in 1865. The Ireland rugby union team played their first home match at Observatory Lane in 1875 against England, after Lansdowne Road was deemed unsuitable. First-class cricket was first played at Observatory Lane in 1912 when Ireland played Scotland. The ground hosted six first-class matches before World War II, including a match between Ireland and the touring New Zealanders in 1937, in which no team passed 100 in any of the four innings. Ireland played the Marylebone Cricket Club in 1948, with a 27 year wait before the next first-class match was played at the ground in 1975. To date, 13 first-class matches have been played at Observatory Lane, the last in 2012 against Afghanistan in the ICC Intercontinental Cup. List A cricket was first played at Observatory Lane in the 2005 ICC Trophy, with the ground hosting two matches. A third List A match was played there between Leinster Lightning and Northern Knights in the 2017 Inter-Provincial Cup, with Leinster Lightning due to play a further List A match there in the 2018 Inter-Provincial Cup. Women's international cricket was first played at Observatory Lane in 1990, when Ireland women played England women in a Women's One Day International (WODI). To date six WODIs have been played at the ground, along with two Women's Twenty20 Internationals in 2009.

Records

First-class
 Highest team total: 462 by Ireland v Canada, 2011
 Lowest team total: 30 by Ireland v New Zealanders, 1937
 Highest individual innings: 144 by Andrew White for Ireland v Netherlands, 2010
 Best bowling in an innings: 8-80 by Robert Gregory for Ireland v Scotland, 1912
 Best bowling in a match: 10-45 by James Boucher for Ireland v Minor Counties, 1937

List A
 Highest team total: 239/8 by Leinster Lightning v Northern Knights, 2017
 Lowest team total: 132 by Northern Knights v Leinster Lightning, as above
 Highest individual innings: 126* by Kenneth Kamyuka for Uganda v Papua New Guinea, 2005
 Best bowling in an innings: 5-23 by Andrew Britton for North West Warriors v Leinster Lightning, 2018

See also
List of Leinster Lightning grounds
List of cricket grounds in Ireland

Notes and references

External links
Observatory Lane, Dublin at CricketArchive

Cricket grounds in County Dublin
Sports venues in Dublin (city)
Sports venues completed in 1865
1865 establishments in Ireland
Rugby union stadiums in Ireland